Keyun Lu Station is a station on Line 5 of the Guangzhou Metro. It is located at the under the junction of Huangpu Avenue Middle and Keyun Road in the Tianhe District, near Tianhe Science and Technology Park. It opened on 28December 2009.

Station layout

Exits

References

Railway stations in China opened in 2009
Guangzhou Metro stations in Tianhe District